The railways in Corsica (part of France) are metre gauge and are operated by Chemins de fer de la Corse. A list of stations follows.

Maps

Open 

 Calvi - terminus in northwest.
 Calenzana
 Algajola
 L'Ille-Rousse
 Le Regino
 Belgodere
 Palasca
 Novella
 Pietralba
 Ponte-Leccia - junction in midlands
 Francardo
 Omessa
 Soveria
 Corte
 Poggio-Riventosa
 Venaco
 Vecchio
 Vivario
 Tattone
 Vizzavona
 Bocognano
 Tavera
 Ucciani
 Carbuccia
 Mezzana
 Caldaniccia - stillborn junction to Propriano
 Campo-dell'Oro
 Ajaccio - terminus and capital in southwest

 Ponte-Leccia - junction in midlands
 Ponte-Nuovo
 Barchetta
 Ponte-Nuovo
 Casamozza - former junction on east coast
 Lucciana
 Borgo
 Biguglia
 Furiani
 Lupino, Corsica
 Bastia - terminus in northeast

Closed 
 Casamozza - former junction on east coast
 Arena-Vescovato
 St. Pancrace
 Folelli-Orezza
 Moriani-Orezza
 Prunete-Cervione
 Alistro
 Bravone
 Tallone
 Pont-du-Tavignano
 Aleria
 Puzzichella
 Ghisonaccia
 Prunelli-Pietrapola
 Cavone, Corsica
 Pont-du-Travo-Ventiseri
 Solaro
 Solenzo
 Favone
 Figa
 Ste.Lucie-Conca
 Lecci
 Torre
 Porto-Vecchio - closed terminus in southeast; stillborn extension to Bonifacio

Never Built 
 Caldaniccia - stillborn junction
 Propriano - stillborn terminus in southeast
 Porto-Vecchio - stillborn junction
 Bonifacio - stillborn terminus in southeast

See also 

 List of never used railways

References